Svetlana Petrovna Goryacheva (née Bezdetko; born June 3, 1947) is a Russian politician. She was a deputy of the State Duma from the party A Just Russia, and served as Deputy Chairman of the Committee on Rules and Organization and the deputy parliamentary leader of A Just Russia. Goryacheva was born in Risovy, a village in Anuchinsky District, Primorsky Krai.

She was a elected a deputy of the State Duma in 1995, and sat as such from 1996 until 2014. She is also a member of the Parliamentary Assembly of the Council of Europe.

Since September 2014, she has represented the Legislative Assembly of Primorsky Krai in the Federation Council. First Deputy Chairman of the Federation Council Committee on Rules and Organization of parliamentary activity.

Due to her support of the Russian invasion of Ukraine, the EU, US, UK, and other countries added Goryacheva to their sanctions lists.

References

External links
 Профайл на сайте Государственной думы
 Официальная страница
     Биография

1947 births
Living people
People from Primorsky Krai
Recipients of the Order of Honour (Russia)
Soviet jurists
20th-century jurists
Russian jurists
Communist Party of the Soviet Union members
Communist Party of the Russian Federation members
A Just Russia politicians
Soviet politicians
Soviet women in politics
21st-century Russian politicians
21st-century Russian women politicians
20th-century Russian women politicians
Defenders of the White House (1993)
Second convocation members of the State Duma (Russian Federation)
Third convocation members of the State Duma (Russian Federation)
Fourth convocation members of the State Duma (Russian Federation)
Fifth convocation members of the State Duma (Russian Federation)
Sixth convocation members of the State Duma (Russian Federation)
Members of the Federation Council of Russia (after 2000)